Dalla geon is a species of butterfly in the family Hesperiidae. It is primarily found in Ecuador.

References

Butterflies described in 1898
geon
Hesperiidae of South America
Taxa named by Paul Mabille